The 2006–07 Colorado Avalanche season was their 12th National Hockey League season in Denver, Colorado.  It was a season of transition for the Avs, as the team began the season with a new General Manager in Francois Giguere, ending the twelve-year reign of Pierre Lacroix.  The off-season also featured the departures of Alex Tanguay and Rob Blake, continuing the trend of star players leaving Denver that began the previous year.

After a decade near the top of the Western Conference standings, the Avalanche were expected to struggle to make the playoffs in 2006–07.  The team's expected decline also saw attendance take a hit, as Colorado's NHL record sellout streak of 487 games was ended on October 16 when 17,681 tickets were sold for a game, 326 shy of a sellout.

Joe Sakic was the lone representative for the Avalanche at the 2007 All-Star Game in Dallas. Sakic recorded four assists at the game.

Entering the final week of the season on April 3, 2007, Colorado was 7 points behind the Calgary Flames for the 8th and final spot in the Western Conference standings.  Needing Calgary to lose all four games that week and for them to win all four they fell short by 1 point.  Calgary losing to Colorado, San Jose, Edmonton, and again to Colorado did not capture a point that week and Colorado winning three out of four was knocked out of contention when they lost to the Nashville Predators on April 7, 2007.  The following night, the Avalanche beat the Flames 6–3 giving them 95 points overall on the season and one short of Calgary who had 96.  With the 95 points, the Avalanche became the team with the highest point total in a season to not make the playoffs, missing the post-season for the first time since 1994 back when they were known as the Quebec Nordiques, despite going 15–2–2 to end the regular season. This record would later be matched by the 2010–11 Dallas Stars, who also failed to qualify for the playoffs with 95 points. Both the Avalanche and the Stars were passed by the 2014-15 Boston Bruins, 2017-18 Florida Panthers, and the 2018-19 Montreal Canadiens, who each earned 96.

Regular season

Season standings

Schedule and results

|- align="center"
| 1 || October 4 || Dallas || 3 – 2 || Colorado || OT || Theodore || 18,007 || 0–0–1 || 1
|- align="center"
| 2 || October 5 || Colorado || 2 – 3 || Minnesota || OT || Budaj || 18,568 || 0–0–2 || 2
|- align="center" bgcolor="#bbffbb" 
| 3 || October 8 || Vancouver || 2 – 3 || Colorado || || Theodore || 18,007 || 1–0–2 || 4
|- align="center" bgcolor="#ffbbbb"
| 4 || October 14 || Edmonton || 4 – 3 || Colorado || || Theodore || 18,007 || 1–1–2 || 4
|- align="center" bgcolor="#ffbbbb"
| 5 || October 16 || Chicago || 5 – 3 || Colorado || || Theodore || 17,681 || 1–2–2 || 4
|- align="center" bgcolor="#bbffbb" 
| 6 || October 18 || Colorado || 4 – 1 || Toronto || || Budaj || 19,463 || 2–2–2 || 6
|- align="center" bgcolor="#bbffbb" 
| 7 || October 19 || Colorado || 2 – 1 || Ottawa || || Theodore || 17,728 || 3–2–2 || 8
|- align="center" bgcolor="#ffbbbb"
| 8 || October 21 || Colorado || 5 – 8 || Montreal || || Theodore || 21,273 || 3–3–2 || 8
|- align="center" bgcolor="#bbffbb" 
| 9 || October 23 || Los Angeles || 1 – 6 || Colorado || || Budaj || 17,284 || 4–3–2 || 10
|- align="center" bgcolor="#ffbbbb"
| 10 || October 25 || Washington || 5 – 3 || Colorado || || Budaj || 17,047 || 4–4–2 || 10
|- align="center" bgcolor="#bbffbb" 
| 11 || October 29 || Minnesota || 1 – 4 || Colorado || || Theodore || 17,615 || 5–4–2 || 12
|-

|- align="center" bgcolor="#bbffbb" 
| 12 || November 1 || Colorado || 5 – 3 || Columbus || || Theodore || 16,007 || 6–4–2 || 14
|- align="center" bgcolor="#ffbbbb"
| 13 || November 2 || Colorado || 1 – 4 || St. Louis || || Budaj || 9,467 || 6–5–2 || 14
|- align="center" bgcolor="#bbffbb" 
| 14 || November 4 || Vancouver || 2 – 3 || Colorado || || Theodore || 18,007 || 7–5–2 || 16
|- align="center" bgcolor="#ffbbbb"
| 15 || November 7 || Los Angeles || 6 – 5 || Colorado || || Budaj || 17,196 || 7–6–2 || 16
|- align="center" bgcolor="#ffbbbb" 
| 16 || November 11 || Colorado || 0 – 1 || Nashville || || Theodore || 17,113 || 7–7–2 || 16
|- align="center" bgcolor="#ffbbbb"
| 17 || November 13 || Edmonton || 2 – 1 || Colorado || || Theodore || 17,725 || 7–8–2 || 16
|- align="center" bgcolor="#ffbbbb"
| 18 || November 15 || San Jose || 4 – 3 || Colorado || || Theodore || 18,007 || 7–9–2 || 16
|- align="center" bgcolor="#bbffbb" 
| 19 || November 17 || Colorado || 3 – 0 || Columbus || || Budaj || 16,375 || 8–9–2 || 18
|- align="center" bgcolor="#bbffbb" 
| 20 || November 18 || Colorado || 2 – 1 || Minnesota || SO || Budaj || 18,568 || 9–9–2 || 20
|- align="center" bgcolor="#ffbbbb"
| 21 || November 20 || Colorado || 4 – 5 || Dallas || || Budaj || 17,491 || 9–10–2 || 20
|- align="center" bgcolor="#bbffbb" 
| 22 || November 22 || Anaheim || 2 – 3 || Colorado || SO || Theodore || 17,104 || 10–10–2 || 22
|- align="center" bgcolor="#bbffbb" 
| 23 || November 25 || Vancouver || 1 – 4 || Colorado || || Theodore || 17,825 || 11–10–2 || 24
|- align="center" bgcolor="#ffbbbb"
| 24 || November 28 || Colorado || 2 – 5 || Calgary || || Theodore || 19,289 || 11–11–2 || 24
|- align="center" bgcolor="#bbffbb" 
| 25 || November 30 || Colorado || 7 – 3 || Edmonton || || Budaj || 16,839 || 12–11–2 || 26
|-

|- align="center" bgcolor="#ffbbbb"
| 26 || December 2 || Colorado || 1 – 2 || Vancouver || || Budaj || 18,630 || 12–12–2 || 26
|- align="center" bgcolor="#ffbbbb"
| 27 || December 5 || Columbus || 3 – 0 || Colorado || || Budaj || 17,339 || 12–13–2 || 26
|- align="center" bgcolor="#bbffbb" 
| 28 || December 7 || Colorado || 5 – 2 || San Jose || || Theodore || 17,039 || 13–13–2 || 28
|- align="center" bgcolor="#ffbbbb"
| 29 || December 9 || Colorado || 4 – 5 || Los Angeles || || Theodore || 17,079 || 13–14–2 || 28
|- align="center" bgcolor="#bbffbb" 
| 30 || December 11 || Carolina || 2 – 5 || Colorado || || Budaj || 17,113 || 14–14–2 || 30
|- align="center" bgcolor="#bbffbb" 
| 31 || December 13 || St. Louis || 1 – 4 || Colorado || || Budaj || 18,007 || 15–14–2 || 32
|- align="center" bgcolor="#bbffbb" 
| 32 || December 15 || Edmonton || 1 – 4 || Colorado || || Budaj || 17,589 || 16–14–2 || 34
|- align="center" bgcolor="#ffbbbb"
| 33 || December 17 || Colorado || 1 – 2 || Chicago || || Theodore || 11,111 || 16–15–2 || 34
|- align="center" bgcolor="#bbffbb" 
| 34 || December 19 || Colorado || 7 – 6 || Edmonton || || Budaj || 16,839 || 17–15–2 || 36
|- align="center"
| || December 21 || Calgary || PPD† || Colorado || || || || ||
|- align="center" bgcolor="#bbffbb" 
| 35 || December 23 || Chicago || 2 – 3 || Colorado || || Theodore || 17,347 || 18–15–2 || 38
|- align="center" bgcolor="#ffbbbb"
| 36 || December 27 || Dallas || 5 – 4 || Colorado || || Theodore || 18,007 || 18–16–2 || 38
|- align="center" bgcolor="#ffbbbb"
| 37 || December 29 || St. Louis || 4 – 2 || Colorado || || Budaj || 18,007 || 18–17–2 || 38
|- align="center" bgcolor="#ffbbbb"
| 38 || December 30 || Colorado || 0 – 2 || St. Louis || || Budaj || 16,078 || 18–18–2 || 38
|-
| colspan=9 | †December 21 game against Calgary was postponed due to a snowstorm.  The game was made up on April 8.
|-

|- align="center" bgcolor="#bbffbb" 
| 39 || January 1 || Colorado || 5 – 3 || Nashville || || Budaj || 15,878 || 19–18–2 || 40
|- align="center" bgcolor="#bbffbb"
| 40 || January 5 || Tampa Bay || 2 – 4 || Colorado || || Budaj || 18,007 || 20–18–2 || 42
|- align="center" bgcolor="#bbffbb"
| 41 || January 6 || Colorado || 2 – 1 || Minnesota || SO || Budaj || 18,568 || 21–18–2 || 44
|- align="center"
| 42 || January 9 || Detroit || 4 – 3 || Colorado || SO || Budaj || 18,007 || 21–18–3 || 45
|- align="center" bgcolor="#ffbbbb"
| 43 || January 11 || Calgary || 7 – 3 || Colorado || || Budaj || 18,007 || 21–19–3 || 45
|- align="center" bgcolor="#bbffbb" 
| 44 || January 13 || Colorado || 3 – 2 || Anaheim || SO || Budaj || 17,174 || 22–19–3 || 47
|- align="center" bgcolor="#ffbbbb"
| 45 || January 15 || Colorado || 1 – 3 || San Jose || || Budaj || 17,496 || 22–20–3 || 47
|- align="center" bgcolor="#bbffbb" 
| 46 || January 17 || Phoenix || 3 – 4 || Colorado || || Budaj || 17,183 || 23–20–3 || 49
|- align="center" bgcolor="#bbffbb" 
| 47 || January 20 || Detroit || 1 – 3 || Colorado || || Budaj || 18,007 || 24–20–3 || 51
|- align="center"
| 48 || January 26 || Phoenix || 5 – 4 || Colorado || SO || Budaj || 18,007 || 24–20–4 || 52
|- align="center" bgcolor="#ffbbbb"
| 49 || January 28 || Colorado || 1 – 3 || Detroit || || Theodore || 20,066 || 24–21–4 || 52
|- align="center" bgcolor="#bbffbb" 
| 50 || January 30 || Nashville || 3 – 4 || Colorado || || Budaj || 17,119 || 25–21–4 || 54
|-

|- align="center" bgcolor="#ffbbbb"
| 51 || February 1 || Minnesota || 5 – 3 || Colorado || || Budaj || 17,286 || 25–22–5 || 54
|- align="center" bgcolor="#ffbbbb"
| 52 || February 3 || Edmonton || 3 – 2 || Colorado || || Budaj || 17,645 || 25–23–5 || 54
|- align="center" bgcolor="#bbffbb" 
| 53 || February 6 || Florida || 4 – 5 || Colorado || OT || Theodore || 17,065 || 26–23–5 || 56
|- align="center" bgcolor="#ffbbbb"
| 54 || February 8 || Atlanta || 6 – 3 || Colorado || || Budaj || 17,428 || 26–24–5 || 56
|- align="center" bgcolor="#ffbbbb"
| 55 || February 11 || Colorado || 5 – 7 || Dallas || || Theodore || 17,506 || 26–25–5 || 56
|- align="center" bgcolor="#bbffbb" 
| 56 || February 13 || Anaheim || 0 – 2 || Colorado || || Budaj || 17,512 || 27–25–4 || 58
|- align="center" bgcolor="#bbffbb" 
| 57 || February 15 || Colorado || 7 – 5 || Calgary || || Theodore || 19,289 || 28–25–4 || 60
|- align="center" bgcolor="#ffbbbb"
| 58 || February 17 || Colorado || 2 – 5 || Calgary || || Budaj || 19,289 || 28–26–4 || 60
|- align="center" bgcolor="#ffbbbb"
| 59 || February 18 || Colorado || 4 – 5 || Vancouver  ||  || Theodore || 18,630 || 28–27–4 || 60
|- align="center" bgcolor="#bbffbb"
| 60 || February 20 || Calgary  || 3 – 4 || Colorado ||  || Budaj || 17,623 || 29–27–4 || 62
|- align="center" bgcolor="#ffbbbb"
| 61 || February 22 || Minnesota  || 4 – 3 || Colorado ||  || Budaj || 18,007 || 29–28–4 || 62
|- align="center"
| 62 || February 24 || Colorado || 5 – 6 || Los Angeles || SO || Budaj || 18,118 || 29–28–5 || 63
|- align="center" bgcolor="#ffbbbb"
| 63 || February 25 || Colorado || 3 – 5 || Anaheim || || Theodore || 17,174 || 29–29–5 || 63
|- align="center" bgcolor="#bbffbb" 
| 64 || February 27 || Columbus || 2 – 3 || Colorado || || Budaj || 17,127 || 30–29–5 || 65
|-

|- align="center" bgcolor="#bbffbb" 
| 65 || March 1 || Colorado || 6 – 1 || Chicago || || Budaj || 10,522 || 31–29–5 || 67
|- align="center" bgcolor="#bbffbb"
| 66 || March 4 || Colorado || 4 – 3 || Detroit || OT || Budaj || 20,066 || 32–29–5 || 69
|- align="center" bgcolor="#bbffbb"
| 67 || March 6 || Colorado || 2 – 0 || Boston || || Budaj || 11,707 || 33–29–5 || 71
|- align="center" bgcolor="#bbffbb"
| 68 || March 7 || Colorado || 3 – 2 || Buffalo || || Budaj  || 18,690 || 34–29–5 || 73
|- align="center"
| 69 || March 11 || Colorado || 2 – 3 || Minnesota || SO || Budaj || 18,568 || 34–29–6 || 74
|- align="center" bgcolor="#bbffbb"
| 70 || March 14 || Calgary || 2 – 3 || Colorado || || Budaj || 17,426 || 35–29–6 || 76
|- align="center" bgcolor="#bbffbb"
| 71 || March 17 || Colorado || 6 – 3 || Phoenix || || Budaj || 17,179 || 36–29–6 || 78
|- align="center" bgcolor="#bbffbb"
| 72 || March 18 || San Jose || 3 – 4 || Colorado || SO || Budaj || 18,007 || 37–29–6 || 80
|- align="center" bgcolor="#bbffbb"
| 73 || March 21 || Colorado || 5 – 1 || Edmonton || || Budaj || 16,839 || 38–29–6 || 82
|- align="center"
| 74 || March 23 || Colorado || 3 – 4 || Edmonton || SO || Budaj || 16,839 || 38–29–7 || 83
|- align="center" bgcolor="#bbffbb"
| 75 || March 25 || Colorado || 5 – 4 || Vancouver || SO || Theodore || 18,630 || 39–29–7 || 85
|- align="center" bgcolor="#ffbbbb"
| 76 || March 27 || Vancouver || 3 – 0 || Colorado || || Theodore || 17,437 || 39–30–7 || 85
|- align="center" bgcolor="#bbffbb"
| 77 || March 29 || Colorado || 4 – 3 || Phoenix || || Budaj || 16,110 || 40–30–7 || 87
|- align="center" bgcolor="#bbffbb"
| 78 || March 31 || Minnesota || 1 – 2 || Colorado || || Budaj || 17,192 || 41–30–7 || 89
|-

|- align="center" bgcolor="#bbffbb"
| 79 || April 3 || Colorado || 4 – 3 || Calgary || || Budaj || 19,289 || 42–30–7 || 91
|- align="center" bgcolor="#bbffbb"
| 80 || April 5 || Colorado || 3 – 1 || Vancouver || || Budaj || 18,630 || 43–30–7 || 93
|- align="center" bgcolor="#ffbbbb"
| 81 || April 7 || Nashville || 4 – 2 || Colorado || || Budaj || 17,462 || 43–31–7 || 93
|- align="center" bgcolor="#bbffbb"
| 82 || April 8† || Calgary || 3 – 6 || Colorado || || Theodore || 17,551 || 44–31–7 || 95
|-
| colspan=9| †Makeup date for the December 21 game that was postponed.
|-

Player statistics

Skaters
Note: GP = Games played; G = Goals; A = Assists; Pts = Points; PIM = Penalty minutes

†Denotes player spent time with another team before joining Colorado.  Stats reflect time with the Avalanche only.
‡Traded during the season.

Goaltenders
Note: GP = Games played; Min = Minutes played; W = Wins; L = Losses; OT = Overtime/shootout losses; GA = Goals against; SO = Shutouts; SV% = Save percentage; GAA = Goals against average

Transactions
The Avalanche were involved in the following transactions during the 2006–07 season.

Trades

Free agents

Draft picks
Colorado's picks at the 2006 NHL Entry Draft in Vancouver, British Columbia.

Farm teams

Albany River Rats
The Avalanche signed a one-year deal to join the Carolina Hurricanes as the NHL affiliate for the Albany River Rats for the 2006–07 AHL season.

During the season, the Avs announced that they had signed a long term deal to be the NHL affiliate of the new Cleveland expansion team beginning in 2007–08.  Coincidentally, the new franchise is a reincarnation of the Utah Grizzlies franchise, which played in Denver as the Denver Grizzlies until 1995, when the Avs came to Denver.

Arizona Sundogs
The Arizona Sundogs began their inaugural season in the Central Hockey League.

See also
2006–07 NHL season

References

Player stats: Colorado Avalanche player stats on espn.com.
Game log: Colorado Avalanche game log on espn.com.
Team standings: NHL standings on espn.com.

Colorado
Colorado
Colorado Avalanche seasons
Colorado Avalanche
Colorado Avalanche